The Adventure Game is a game show that was originally broadcast on UK television channels BBC1 and BBC2 between 24 May 1980 and 18 February 1986. The story in each show was that the two celebrity contestants and a member of the public had travelled by space ship to the planet Arg. Their overall task varied with each series. For example, the team might be charged with finding a crystal needed to power their ship to return to Earth. The programme is often considered to have been a forerunner of The Crystal Maze.

Background
The programme was devised by experienced BBC producer Patrick Dowling (who also introduced episodes of series 2). Dowling had an interest in Dungeons and Dragons and wanted to televise a show that would capture the mood. The programme also had a similar sci-fi feel influenced by Douglas Adams; Dowling asked Adams to write the show, but the latter was busy with the television production of The Hitchhiker's Guide to the Galaxy. The first two series were written and produced by Dowling and directed by Ian Oliver, who wrote and produced the final two series after Dowling retired.Peter Hawkins provided the opening narration for series 1 and 4.

The characters
Arg was inhabited by shapeshifting dragons known as Argonds. As a reference to this, most proper nouns in the programme (including Argond) were anagrams of the word dragon. To avoid scaring contestants, Argonds commonly shifted form, mostly to human, a few minutes before the contestants arrived.

Notable characters within the game included:
 The Rangdo, who was the ruler of planet Arg and initially referred to as "Uncle" by the other Argonds. In the first series, his human form was played by Ian Messiter, who appeared as an old professor in a velvet jacket, but in later series he became one of the few Argonds not to appear as a dragon. In series 2 and 3, he became an aspidistra atop an elegant plant stand; and in series 3 he could move around the room and roared and shook when he was angry (the Rangdo was controlled by Kenny Baker). Any human meeting the Rangdo immediately had to placate him by bowing while uttering the phrase "Gronda! Gronda!". In the last series, the Rangdo changed into a teapot instead, spouting steam when displeased.
 Darong (series 1, played by BBC newsreader Moira Stuart).
 Gnoard (series 1 – 3, played by Charmian Gradwell), whose job it was to explain the initial stages of the game to the contestants.
 Dorgan (series 4, played by Sarah Lam), who took over from Gnoard in the final series.
 Gandor (series 1 – 4, played by Chris Leaver), an ancient, half-deaf butler who took the contestants through most of the puzzles and refereed the Vortex and Drogna games. In some episodes, he could only hear when he was wearing his spectacles, which he continually (and conveniently) misplaced.
 Rongad (series 3 & 4, played by Bill Homewood), because he was Australian, spoke English backwards and could only understand the contestants if they did the same. His Australian accent was a mild clue to help the contestants realise he was speaking backwards. Noted for habitually singing Waltzing Matilda in reverse, and exclamations of "Doog yrev!" when the contestants did well. He appears in every episode of series 3 and episode 2 of series 4.
 Angord (series 4, actor unknown) was an Argond who never seemed to turn into a human. She always misbehaved when Gandor and Dorgan were checking over the puzzles.
 The Mole (series 2, played by Lesley Judd), pretended to be one of the regular contestants but was actually working against them. The actress had been a genuine contestant in the first series.

The look of the characters in Argond form was quite different in the various series. In Series 1, they looked like dragons, and each was rather distinct. In Series 2, they didn't look much like dragons, but were furry, with no tails and mask-like faces, and primarily differed in colour. In Series 3 and 4, their heads returned to looking like dragons, with ruffs, though they had furry bodies and monkeylike tails, and they were almost identical to each other.

Notable contestants included Keith Chegwin, Sue Cook, astronomer Heather Couper, John Craven, Paul Darrow, Noel Edmonds, Sarah Greene, Bonnie Langford, James Burke, Elizabeth Estensen, Janet Fielding and Richard Stilgoe.

The credits for the series listed the human characters as being played by Argonds, rather than the other way round.

Common tasks
The contestants had to complete a number of tasks in order to achieve their overall goal (i.e.. regain their crystal and return to their ship). Many tasks involved the drogna, a small transparent plastic disc containing a solid geometric figure, which was the currency of Arg. The value of a drogna was its numbered position in the visible spectrum multiplied by the number of sides of the figure (though the contestants usually failed to work this out). For example, a red circle is worth one unit, an orange circle is worth two units, a red triangle and a yellow circle are both worth three, and so on.

Tasks which often appeared included:
 Interaction with a computer, in series 1 a 2D dungeon-crawl-type game on an HP 9845 Technical Desktop, then later a text chat with an Apple II that generally failed to provide any useful information until the password was revealed elsewhere and entered into the computer, then in series 3 and 4 a pseudo-3D first-person POV dungeon crawl on a BBC Micro to find the password in the maze. In series 3, the players were guiding an alien doglike creature called a Dogran (voiced in a deep Cockney) down his "Dogran-hole" after meeting him in person. In series 4, the radio-controlled dog puppet was eliminated and the players guided an unseen entity speaking in a Scouse accent to find the password "somewhere in the north" of the maze.
 The Drogna Game, which usually came in the middle of the programme. The rules of play, format and end result of this game was changed frequently, always with each series and sometimes even from one episode to another. One variation from series 3 was played by two players: one would be a contestant and the other would be a creature known as the Red Salamander of Zardil. This version of the game became so popular that Acornsoft released a home version for the BBC Micro, written by Patrick Dowling.
 How many Argonds around the pond. This was a game played predominantly in series 4 just before the Vortex game. Every player had a chance to win, and winners received a "Green Cheese roll" or, in later episodes a "Great Crystal of Arg" to triumphant fanfare. This Green cheese roll was of use when playing the Vortex. Gandor would compère the game; it would start on a table with a number of drogna inside a velvet bag with draw strings. He would shake the bag and withdraw some drognas and place them on the table, then asking the first contestant "How many Argonds are around the pond?". The contestants would usually either count the drognas, count the non-blue drognas (assuming the blue one represented the pond), or add the sides or points of the geometric figures on the drognas, and fail to guess the right number. The key was that Gandor would place his fingers on the table top as he said "How many Argonds are around the pond?" The number of fingers he would place down on the table would be the correct answer. Most people did not guess the answer, or they would just happen to get it right by accident.

 The Vortex (series 2 - 4). This was the last task in the programme. To return to their ship, the players had to jump between a grid of points, taking turns with their opponent, the Vortex. The Vortex was represented by a video-effect-generated pulsating column in series 2, and a computer-generated flashing column in series 3 & 4. If the human player jumped into the Vortex (which they could not see), it would explode and the human was said to have been "evaporated", losing the game and making a long trip back to Earth which had to be walked by foot along the interplanetary highway. Patrick Dowling devised the game, believing that his inspiration was probably nine men's morris.

Episodes
Episodes with a dagger (†) after the number are missing from the BBC archives. However, some of these 'missing' episodes do exist as off-air recordings.

Series 1
Originally broadcast in 1980 on BBC1 on Saturday mornings.

Repeated in 1980 on BBC2 on Saturday mid-afternoons.

Series 2
Originally broadcast in 1981 on BBC2 on Monday early-evenings.

Repeated in 1982 on BBC1 on Friday late-afternoons.

Series 3
Originally broadcast in 1984 on BBC2 on Thursday early-evenings.

Repeated in 1985 on BBC2 on Thursday early-evenings.

Series 4
Originally broadcast in 1986 on BBC2 on Tuesday early-evenings.

Repeated in 2002, 2003, and 2004 on the digital TV channel Challenge.

Signature tune
 Series 1, 3 & 4: Duo in G, Op. 34 No. 2: Rondo, composed by Ferdinando Carulli and performed by classical guitarists Julian Bream and John Williams (and which also appears on their album Together)
 Series 2: Norwegian Dance Opus 35 No. 2, composed by Edvard Grieg and performed by a brass band

Home video releases
In 2016, the show was made available to purchase for the first time, with seven episodes from the first two series available digitally from the online BBC Store.  The store and apps were discontinued on 1 November 2017, rendering purchased programmes no longer playable.

A six-DVD box set of the series was released on 12 June 2017, rated U. The DVDs are region 2–encoded, with a total running time of 665 minutes. The artwork on the discs represents five different colours and shapes of Drogna. Each disc's number can be identified by very small writing around the outer rim. Series one and two are presented on one disc each, with four episodes per disc (each missing one broadcast episode). Series three and four are complete and are split across four discs.

Notes

See also
 The Crystal Maze - Considered to be The Adventure Game'''s spiritual successor.
 Fort Boyard
 Incredible Games - A Children's BBC version of The Adventure Game'', which used many of the same games.
 Knightmare - virtual reality children's game show.

References

External links
 
 The Adventure Game at Simply Media
 
 
 The Adventure Game at Missing-Episodes.com
 Drogna game on the BBC Micro
  The Adventure Game ranked

1980 British television series debuts
1986 British television series endings
1980s British children's television series
BBC children's television shows
British children's game shows
1980s British game shows
Lost BBC episodes
English-language television shows